The Double Standard is a 1917 American silent drama film directed by Phillips Smalley and starring Roy Stewart, Clarissa Selwynne and Joseph W. Girard.

Cast
 Roy Stewart as John Fairbrother
 Clarissa Selwynne as Grace Fairbrother
 Joseph W. Girard as Bishop Ferguson
 Frank Elliott as Charles Ferguson
 Hazel Page as Mace
 Frank Brownlee as Editor George Ferguson
 Irene Aldwyn as Lily
 Maxfield Stanley as Albert
 Dana Ong as Lawyer

References

Bibliography
 Robert B. Connelly. The Silents: Silent Feature Films, 1910-36, Volume 40, Issue 2. December Press, 1998.

External links
 

1917 films
1917 drama films
1910s English-language films
American silent feature films
Silent American drama films
American black-and-white films
Universal Pictures films
Films directed by Phillips Smalley
1910s American films